The 4th Separate Tank Brigade named after Hetman Ivan Vyhovskyi is an armored formation of the Ukrainian Ground Forces.

History
The 4th Tank Brigade was established in late 2017 with the purpose of serving as a reserve unit to the 1st and 17th Tank Brigades within the Ukrainian Armed Forces. It was equipped with T-64 and T-72 tanks. The brigade underwent training and preparation for combat, including a final stage of combat readiness at Honcharivske training base, the home of the 1st Tank Brigade, in July 2018.

During the Russo-Ukrainian War in 2019, the 4th Brigade was sent to the Joint Forces Operation Zone to support the 72nd Mechanized and 36th Marines brigades. The brigade was equipped with T-72 and BMP-2 IFVs, and various artillery pieces. In October of that year, the brigade participated in a joint exercise that involved crossing a river, supported by attack helicopters, and attacking suspected enemy positions.

When Russia invaded Ukraine in February 2022, the 4th Tank Brigade was deployed to help defend the northeastern part of the country. The brigade played a significant role in the Battle of Kharkiv and subsequent Eastern Ukraine offensive. It was initially deployed in the area of Sloviansk-Kramatorsk as a reserve unit and later stationed south of Izium.

On February 24, 2023, which marked the one-year anniversary of the invasion of Ukraine, Poland handed over the first four out of 14 Leopard 2A4 main battle tanks to the 4th Tank Brigade.

Current structure 
As of 2023 the brigade's structure is as follows:

 4th Separate Tank Brigade
 Brigade’s Headquarters
 1st Tank Battalion
 2nd Tank Battalion
 3rd Tank Battalion
 4th Tank Battalion
 Mechanized Battalion
 Artillery Group
 Anti-Aircraft Defense Battalion
 Reconnaissance Company
 Engineer Battalion
 Logistic Battalion
 Maintenance Battalion
 Signal Company
 Radar Company
 Medical Company
 CBRN Protection Company

References

Brigades of the Ukrainian Ground Forces
Armoured brigades of Ukraine
Military units and formations of Ukraine in the war in Donbas
Military units and formations of the 2022 Russian invasion of Ukraine